The Italy national racquetball team represents the Federazione Italiana Racquetball in racquetball international competitions. Is a member of the European Racquetball Federation and International Racquetball Federation.

History

Players
National team in World Championships 1992 Montreal, Canada
 Nadia Verilli  
National team in the European Championships 1997 Hamburg

Jacopo Sasso
Pasquale De Nora
National team in the European Championships 1999 Bad Tölz
Jacopo Sasso 
Bruno Aletta
National team in the European Championships 2009

References

External links
 Racquetball Italia Italy Racquetball Federation

National racquetball teams
Racquetball
Racquetball in Italy